The 2017 Rugby League World Cup was the fifteenth staging of the Rugby League World Cup tournament and took place in Australia, New Zealand and Papua New Guinea between 27 October and 2 December 2017. The tournament featured the national teams of 14 Rugby League International Federation member countries who qualified through either standing in the previous tournament or a series of qualification play-off matches. In the final, defending champions Australia, playing in their 14th consecutive final, defeated England at Brisbane's Lang Park.

Host selection

At the 2010 Rugby League International Federation executive meeting, the New Zealand Rugby League made an early submission to co-host the 2017 tournament with Australia. The Rugby League World Cup was last held in Australia in 2008.

Two formal bids were subsequently received by the RLIF before a November 2012 deadline; the co-host bid from Australia and New Zealand and a bid from South Africa. On 19 February 2014, it was announced that the joint bid from Australia and New Zealand had won hosting rights.

Michael Brown, the CEO of several big name Australian sporting franchises and the 2015 AFC Asian Cup, was originally appointed CEO of the World Cup in 2015, but resigned less than a year later due to 'workload' and 'homesickness'. He was replaced by Andrew Hill.

Teams

Qualification

It was announced on 3 August 2014 that 7 of the 8 quarter-finalists from the last World Cup would qualify automatically for the 2017 tournament; hosts Australia and New Zealand, plus England, Fiji, France, Samoa and Scotland. The USA, who were also 2013 quarter-finalists, were denied automatic qualification after a long-running internal governance dispute saw their RLIF membership temporarily suspended in 2014; later, once the matter was resolved, they were accepted into the qualification process. Papua New Guinea were initially set to be involved in the qualifying competition but were later granted automatic qualification, due to becoming co-hosts of the tournament. In addition to the eight automatic qualifiers, the remaining six spots will come from four different qualification zones; three from Europe, one from Asia/Pacific, one from Americas and one from Middle East/Africa.

Tonga were the first team to qualify from the qualification stage after winning the Asian-Pacific play-off. Lebanon were the second team to qualify from the qualification stage, after winning the Middle East-African play-off. The USA were the third team to qualify, winning the Americas qualification group.

Draw 
The draw was undertaken at the launch of the event in Auckland on 19 July 2016 and involved the same four group format as the 2013 tournament.
The first two groups are made up of four teams whilst the other two groups feature three teams each. The top three teams in the first two groups and the winners of the two smaller groups will qualify for the quarter-finals. Group play will involve a round robin in the larger groups, and a round robin in the smaller groups with an additional inter-group game for each team so all teams will play three group games.

Squads

Each team submitted a squad of twenty-four players for the tournament, the same as the 2013 tournament.

Venues

It was announced in October 2014 that negotiations were being held for Papua New Guinea to host matches. The Papua New Guinea Rugby Football League presented to the RLIF in September 2015, requesting to host three matches. In October 2015 it was confirmed that Papua New Guinea would host three matches in the group stage.

Melbourne Rectangular Stadium in Melbourne hosted the opening game between Australia and England while Brisbane Stadium in Brisbane hosted the World Cup Final.

Australia

New Zealand

Papua New Guinea

Officiating

The match officials will be headed by Tony Archer and three coaches: Steve Ganson, Russell Smith and Luke Watts.

 : Grant Atkins, Chris Butler, Matt Cecchin, Steve Chiddy, Ben Cummins, Adam Gee, Ashley Klein, Jared Maxwell, David Munro, Ziggy Przeklasa-Adamski, Belinda Sleeman, Jon Stone, Bernard Sutton, Chris Sutton, Gerard Sutton, Michael Wise
 : Phil Bentham, James Child, Mark Craven, Robert Hicks, Chris Kendall, Scott Mikalauskas, Liam Moore, Tim Roby, Ben Thaler
 : Chris McMillan, Henry Perenara

Warm-up matches

Group stage 
The first two groups are made up of four teams whilst the other two groups feature three teams each. The top three teams in the Group A and B, and the winners of Group C and D will qualify for the quarter-finals. Group play will involve a round robin in the larger groups, and a round robin in the smaller groups with an additional inter-group game for each team so all teams will play three group games.

Group A

Group B

Group C

Group D

Inter-group matches

Knockout stage 

Three teams from each of Groups A and B and one team from each of Groups C and D advanced to the quarter-finals. All quarter-finalists automatically qualified for the 2021 Rugby League World Cup. The quarter-final fixture were finalised at the conclusion of the pool stages, to ensure that Australia played in Darwin on 17 November and New Zealand in Wellington on 18 November.

Quarter-finals

Australia vs Samoa

Tonga vs Lebanon

New Zealand vs Fiji

England vs Papua New Guinea

Semi-finals

Australia vs Fiji

Tonga vs England

Final: Australia vs England

Statistics

Top try scorers
12 tries
 Valentine Holmes

9 tries
 Suliasi Vunivalu

7 tries
 Jermaine McGillvary

5 tries

 Billy Slater
 David Fusitu'a
 Michael Jennings

4 tries

 Dane Gagai
 Wade Graham
 Cameron Munster
 Taane Milne
 David Mead
 Justin Olam

3 tries

 Kallum Watkins
 Viliame Kikau
 Kevin Naiqama
 Henry Raiwalui
 Liam Kay
 Nene Macdonald
 Peta Hiku
 Te Maire Martin
 Roger Tuivasa-Sheck
 Tuimoala Lolohea

2 tries

 Boyd Cordner
 Josh Dugan
 Michael Morgan
 John Bateman
 Gareth Widdop
 Jarryd Hayne
 Marcelo Montoya
 Bastien Ader
 Oliver Roberts
 James Tedesco
 Joseph Tramontana
 Adam Doueihi
 Abbas Miski
 Travis Robinson
 Shaun Johnson
 Jason Nightingale
 Jordan Rapana
 Watson Boas
 Lachlan Lam
 Garry Lo
 Rhyse Martin
 Will Hopoate
 Peni Terepo
 Daniel Tupou

1 try

 Tyson Frizell
 Tom Trbojevic
 Matt Gillett
 Tom Burgess
 Ben Currie
 James Graham
 Ryan Hall
 Mark Percival
 Stefan Ratchford
 Alex Walmsley
 Kane Evans
 Salesi Junior Fainga'a
 Joe Lovodua
 Ben Nakubuwai
 Brayden Wiliame
 Akuila Uate
 Eloni Vunakece
 Damien Cardace
 Benjamin Garcia
 Mark Kheirallah
 Kyle Amor
 Liam Finn
 George King
 Louie McCarthy-Scarsbrook
 Michael McIlorum
 Michael Morgan
 Api Pewhairangi
 Joe Philbin
 Justin Castellaro
 Mason Cerruto
 Ryan Ghietti
 Josh Mantellato
 Nathan Milone
 Paul Vaughan
 Anthony Layoun
 James Elias
 Nick Kassis
 Mitchell Moses
 Jason Wehbe
 Nelson Asofa-Solomona
 Kenny Bromwich
 Issac Liu
 Kodi Nikorima
 Russell Packer
 Brad Takairangi
 Joseph Tapine
 Elijah Taylor
 Dallin Watene-Zelezniak
 Dean Whare
 Paul Aiton
 Wellington Albert
 James Segeyaro
 Rod Griffin
 Stargroth Amean
 Kato Ottio
 Tim Lafai
 Ken Maumalo
 Joseph Paulo
 Junior Paulo
 Ben Roberts
 Jazz Tevaga
 Young Tonumaipea
 Matthew Wright
 Danny Addy
 Frankie Mariano
 Oscar Thomas
 Lewis Tierney
 Ata Hingano
 Manu Ma'u
 Sika Manu
 Ben Murdoch-Masila
 Jason Taumalolo
 Tevita Pangai Junior
 Siliva Havili
 Matt Shipway
 Junior Vaivai
 Regan Grace
 Morgan Knowles
 Ben Morris

Top point scorers

Final standings

Criticism and controversy

The lack of games in New South Wales, the heartland of rugby league in Australia, drew some criticism. Only one of the 13 confirmed tournament venues was in New South Wales (Sydney Football Stadium) and it is only hosting two group-stage fixtures, both featuring Lebanon. This was due to the refusal of the New South Wales Government to bid for hosting rights. Despite the so-called 'Sydney Cup snub', the RLWC organisers backed their decision and the venues they were using.

In the buildup to the Samoa vs. Tonga game in Hamilton, controversy occurred after fans from both countries were caught having brawls in South Auckland. At least 6 people were arrested from the brawls resulting in a massive security increase for the game. Both teams, celebrities, and police urged fans to calm down. Following the results of the controversial incident, a Tongan Advisory Council member lashed out at organisers, saying that this tournament is poorly organised compared to the 2011 Rugby World Cup, mentioning that Rugby World Cup organisers engaged with community groups 18 months beforehand, whereas this tournament was "scrambled around".

After Scotland's 68-point thrashing to New Zealand in Christchurch, captain Danny Brough, Sam Brooks, and Jonathan Walker were sent home for violating code of conduct after being all deemed too 'intoxicated' for their team's flight to Cairns for Scotland's next game against Samoa. Italian players James Tedesco and Shannon Wakeman were under investigation by the World Cup integrity unit for a brawl at a Cairns nightclub.

There was criticism on how Samoa and Lebanon qualified for the Quarter-Finals of the World Cup, while Ireland missed out. Samoa played in Pool B where three sides qualify for the finals and only one misses out. Samoa lost to both New Zealand and Tonga, and drew with Scotland. Lebanon was in Pool A which had the same format as Pool B. Lebanon lost to both Australia and England and beat France. Ireland played in Pool C where there are only three teams and the winner is the only team that goes to the finals. Ireland beat both Italy and Wales and only just lost to Papua New Guinea and didn't qualify for the finals. Irish captain Liam Finn, said "I don't know if it's unfair, it probably makes sense, but to me: try and explain that to someone who's not rugby league," , "That's how we judge it. I tell someone 'we didn't go through, we won two games; someone got through by drawing one," and  "That's where we should be focused: how do we attract new fans when that's how you're explaining the game to them?" in the press conference after his team's victory over Wales.

Broadcasting 
Seven Network was the Australian and worldwide host broadcaster, winning the rights for the event in July 2016, beating the likes of Foxtel and Optus.

References

External links

 
2017 in Australian rugby league
2017 in New Zealand rugby league
2017 in Papua New Guinea rugby league
World Cup
International rugby league competitions hosted by Papua New Guinea
Rugby League World Cup
Rugby League World Cups hosted by Australia
Rugby League World Cups hosted by New Zealand
October 2017 sports events in Oceania
November 2017 sports events in Oceania
December 2017 sports events in Oceania
October 2017 sports events in Australia
November 2017 sports events in Australia
December 2017 sports events in Australia
October 2017 sports events in New Zealand
November 2017 sports events in New Zealand
December 2017 sports events in New Zealand